The Canton of Hesdin is a former canton situated in the department of the Pas-de-Calais and in the Nord-Pas-de-Calais region of northern France. It was disbanded following the French canton reorganisation which came into effect in March 2015. It consisted of 22 communes, which joined the canton of Auxi-le-Château in 2015. It had a total of 10,805 inhabitants (2012).

Geography 
The canton is organised around Hesdin in the arrondissement of Montreuil. The altitude varies from 11 m (Tortefontaine) to 133 m (Chériennes) for an average altitude of 55 m.

The canton comprised 22 communes:

Aubin-Saint-Vaast
Bouin-Plumoison
Brévillers
Capelle-lès-Hesdin
Caumont
Cavron-Saint-Martin
Chériennes
Contes
Guigny
Guisy
Hesdin
Huby-Saint-Leu
Labroye
La Loge
Marconne
Marconnelle
Mouriez
Raye-sur-Authie
Regnauville
Sainte-Austreberthe
Tortefontaine
Wambercourt

Population

See also 
Cantons of Pas-de-Calais 
Communes of Pas-de-Calais 
Arrondissements of the Pas-de-Calais department

References

Hesdin
2015 disestablishments in France
States and territories disestablished in 2015